Neon Genesis Evangelion is an anime series produced by Gainax and Tatsunoko Production and directed by Hideaki Anno. It began broadcasting in Japan on TV Tokyo on October 4, 1995 and ended on March 27, 1996. Evangelion is an apocalyptic anime in the mecha genre. It centers on a teenage boy recruited by a paramilitary organization named NERV to control a giant cyborg called an Evangelion to fight monstrous beings known as Angels. The show takes place largely in a futuristic Tokyo years after a worldwide catastrophe. Parts of the series also focus on other Evangelion pilots and members of NERV as they try to prevent another catastrophe. Installments of the show have been through various re-cuts and cosmetic revisions.

Broadcast history 
After several episodes were produced, the first episode aired on October 4, 1995, long after originally planned. Initially ignored (although received positively by those Gainax fans invited to early screenings), viewership grew slowly and largely by word of mouth.

The 16th episode marked a distinct shift to a more introspective, less action-focused tone that would come to characterize the second half of Evangelion. This change in emphasis was partly due to the intended development of the story, but also partly because by this point, production was running increasingly behind schedule; episode director Kazuya Tsurumaki identifies this as the impetus for Evangelion's turn into internal conflict:
I didn't mind it. The schedule was an utter disaster and the number of cels plummeted, so there were some places where unfortunately the quality suffered. However, the tension of the staff as we all became more desperate and frenzied certainly showed up in the film ... About the time that the production system was completely falling apart, there were some opinions to the effect that, "If we can't do satisfactory work, then what's the point of continuing?" However, I didn't feel that way. My opinion was, "Why don't we show them the entire process including our breakdown."

Despite this, by the 18th episode, the series had become enough of a sensation that Eva-01's violent rampage "[was] criticized as being unsuitable on an anime show that is viewed by children", and the 20th episode would be similarly criticized for the offscreen depiction of characters Misato and Kaji having sex. With this popularity came the first home media merchandise, "Genesis 0:1", containing the first two episodes on VHS and Laserdisc. Beginning a trend, it sold out. When the series finale aired, the plot apparently remained unresolved: the Human Instrumentality Project had reached its final phase, but the last two episodes focus entirely on the internal psychology of the characters, leaving deeply unclear what actually happens in the world of the series narratively. A feature film was created as a complementary, alternate ending to the original episodes 25 and 26 and released in three stages: first as a preview (Neon Genesis Evangelion: Death & Rebirth), then as the completed alternate ending (The End of Evangelion), then finally as a theatrical revival combining the two into one presentation (Revival of Evangelion). On home video, Episodes 21-24 of the television series were eventually re-edited with extended and new scenes to set up the events of the alternate ending.

The series saw its original English dub premiere in Australia on SBS in 1999. The series aired in the United States for the first time English subbed on San Francisco-area PBS member station, superstation KTEH (now KQEH) on March 5, 2000 as part of its Sunday late-prime sci-fi programming line-up. The first two episodes saw its nationwide broadcast English dubbed on Cartoon Network as part of its Toonami programming block's Giant Robot Week on February 24–25, 2003; both episodes were heavily edited for content. About three years later, the full series aired almost entirely unedited on Cartoon Network's Adult Swim from October 21, 2005 to April 14, 2006.

Episodes 
Each episode has two titles: one is the original Japanese title, and the second is an English title that was chosen by Japanese studio Gainax itself and appears as an eye catch. Most often, the official English title is not a direct translation of the Japanese title. For example, the direct translation of the Japanese title of episode 2 is "Unfamiliar Ceilings", but the English title is "The Beast". Sometimes, however, the two titles are either similar or exactly the same, as was the case with the first episode "Angel Attack". The 2019 Netflix release uses the direct translation of Japanese titles, which are those shown below.

Many tracks on the original soundtracks are named after the English episode names in which they are first used, or vice versa.

Complementary ending 
The complementary ending to Neon Genesis Evangelion is first teased in Rebirth, the second half of the theatrical presentation Neon Genesis Evangelion: Death & Rebirth. Rebirth comprises the unfinished first twenty-five minutes of Episode 25' and ends as the Mass Production Evangelions under the control of SEELE sortie to combat Asuka under command of NERV. The full ending, split into two 45-minute episodes, 25' and 26', is shown in the theatrical film The End of Evangelion. These episodes were presented separately and with minor cosmetic differences on early home video releases.

Reception 
While the entire series has received wide attention, individual episodes have also earned praise and occasionally been recipients of awards. For instance, in the 19th Annual Anime Grand Prix, a readers' choice award hosted by Animage magazine, seventeen episodes of Evangelion gained enough votes to be included among the one hundred "Best Loved Single Episodes". Episodes 24 and 26 took first and second place respectively with roughly six hundred votes each.

See also 

 List of Neon Genesis Evangelion chapters
 List of Neon Genesis Evangelion media

Notes

References 

Episodes
Lists of anime episodes
Lists of Japanese television series episodes